Ewose is a small uninhabited island in the Shefa Province of Vanuatu in the Pacific Ocean.

Geography

References

Islands of Vanuatu
Shefa Province
Uninhabited islands of Vanuatu